Jhajjar is a town in Jhajjar district in the Indian state of Haryana. It is situated on the road connecting Rewari to Rohtak (NH-352), Loharu to Meerut (NH334B), Charkhi Dadri to Delhi and Gurgaon to Bhiwani.

Jhajjar is famous for valour and courage of its soldiers in defence forces. Mainly Jhajjar is well known for a larger percentage of youngsters joining Indian Army. Former Army Chief General Dalbir Singh Suhag is a well known example from Jhajjar. Also for their participation in 1857 rebellion, three main chiefs of Haryana were tried and hanged at Kotwali in Chandani Chowk of Old Delhi. Nahar Singh, the Raja of Ballabhgarh, was hanged on 9 January 1858. Abdur Rehman, Nawab of Jhajjar, was hanged on 23 January 1858. Ahmad Ali, Nawab of Farrukhnagar, was hanged on 23 January 1858.

The area occupied by Jhajjar district is 1,890 km2 and its population was 7,09,000 in 2001. The district consists of 2 industrial areas with 2408 plots. The basic industries are ceramics, glass, chemicals, engineering, electrical & electronics. There are 48 large and medium units 213 small scale units with the total investment of Rs. 3400 million ($76.5 million) and workforce of 8248. Major crops grown here are rice, wheat and maize. The total irrigated agricultural land is about 670 km2.

The town is said to have been founded by Chhaju and Chhajunagar was changed to Jhajjar. It is also derived from Jharnaghar, a natural fountain. A third derivation is from Jhajjar, a water vessel, because the surface drainage of the country for miles around runs into the town as into a sink.

History 
Jhajjar is listed in the Ain-i-Akbari as a pargana under Delhi sarkar, producing a revenue of 1,422,451 dams for the imperial treasury and supplying a force of 1000 infantry and 60 cavalry.

Demographics 
, Jhajjar District had a population of 956,907. Males constitute 54% of the population and females constitute 46%. Jhajjar has an average literacy rate of 80.83%, higher than the national average of 74%. Male literacy is 89.44%, and female literacy is 70.16%.
According to the 2011 census Jhajjar district has a population of 956,907, roughly equal to the nation of Fiji or the US state of Montana. This gives it a ranking of 456th in India (out of a total of 640).The district has a population density of 522 inhabitants per square kilometer (1,350 /sq. mi) .[1] Its population growth rate over the decade 2001-2011 was 8.73%.Jhajjar has a sex ratio of 861 females for every 1000 males, and a literacy rate of 80.8%.

In the 2011 National Census, it was found that Jhajjar district has the lowest sex ratio in India of the 0-6 group, with just 774 girls to 1,000 boys. Two villages in Jhajjar have extremely low gender-ratios: Bahrana and Dimana have gender ratios of 378 girls to 1,000 boys and 444 girls to 1,000 boys respectively. In Jhajjar, parents are able to illegally learn the gender of the fetus through secret early morning ultrasounds at registered clinics and through the use of code-words, Ladoo for boy and Jalebi for girl; these families often go on to abort female fetuses.

Religion

City

Tehsil

Transportation 

Jhajjar has its own railway station, with code JHJ. The railway station of the city is situated on Delhi-Jhajjar-Dadri Road. The station supports four trains, including the first CNG train of India and the Jaipur-Chandigarh Intercity train.

Jhajjar City has Haryana's largest Bus Station(I.S.B.T) situated on Rohtak-Jhajjar-Rewari NH-71. This new bus station has an area of 38 acres, including parks for students.

Notable people 

 Kaptan Birdhana - Chairman Zila Parishad District Jhajjar
 Geeta Bhukkal
 Rohit Grewal
 Manushi Chhillar
 Ravi Dahiya
 Naveen Kumar
 Bajrang Punia, wrestler
 Qazi Syed Mohammad Rafi
 Swami Omanand Saraswati
 Virender Sehwag
 Rohit Sharma
 Dalbir Singh
 Ravinder Singh
 Lalit Vashistha
 Devender Grewal

Notable schools 

 Little Angels Senior Secondary School 
DAV Public School
 Mother India School
 G S High School
 Jawahar Navodaya Vidyalaya
 Kendriya Vidyalaya
 New Era High School
 Paradise Public School
 Royal Public School
 St. Francis De Sales School

See also 
 Bahadurgarh
 Beri, Jhajjar
 Badli, Jhajjar

References 

Cities and towns in Jhajjar district